The Concerto for Two Violins in D minor, BWV 1043, also known as the Double Violin Concerto, is a violin concerto of the Late Baroque era, which Johann Sebastian Bach composed around 1730. It is one of the composer's most successful works.

History 
Bach composed his Concerto for Two Violins in D minor, BWV 1043, around 1730, as part of a concert series he ran as the Director of the Collegium Musicum in Leipzig.

Structure

The concerto is characterized by a subtle yet expressive relationship between the violins throughout the work. In addition to the two soloists, the concerto is scored for strings (first violin, second violin and viola parts) and basso continuo. The musical structure of this piece uses fugal imitation and much counterpoint.

The concerto comprises three movements:
 Vivace in D minor
 Largo ma non tanto in F major
 Allegro 

Performance time of the concerto ranges from less than 13 minutes to over 18 minutes.

Reception

Around 1736–1737 Bach arranged the concerto for two harpsichords, transposed into C minor, BWV 1062.

1734–1738 Carl Philipp Emanuel Bach performed the concerto in Frankfurt an der Oder. After his father's death in 1750, Carl Philipp Emanuel inherited some of the original performance parts, likely doubles, of the concerto (surviving: parts for soloists and continuo), and likely also the composer's autograph score (lost). After the Second World War they were lost for several decades, eventually resurfacing in Poland.

Manuscript copies of (parts of) the concerto were produced around 1730–1740, in 1760, around 1760, around 1760–1789, and in the early 19th century. The concerto was first published in 1852, by Edition Peters, edited by Siegfried Dehn. In the first volume of his Bach biography (1873), Philipp Spitta describes the concerto as a product of the composer's Köthen period (1717–1723). After describing Bach's other extant violin concertos, those in E major (BWV 1042) and A minor (BWV 1041), he adds:

The Bach Gesellschaft published the concerto in 1874, edited by Wilhelm Rust. The Neue Bachgesellschaft reports around 25 known public performances of the concerto in the period from late 1904 to early 1907: most of these in Germany, but also performances in other European cities, including London, Madrid, Paris, Riga, St. Petersburg and Vienna, are mentioned. Outside of Europe, there was for instance the performance by Eugène Ysaÿe and Fritz Kreisler in New York in 1905. In London, Bach's Double became a repertoire piece, for instance regularly performed at the Proms.

After commenting that the "A minor and E major concertos are beginning to win a place in our concert halls," Albert Schweitzer writes, in the 1911 English-language edition of his book on Bach:Johannes Umbreit's piano reduction of the orchestral score was published by Henle. 

Research by Andreas Glöckner, published in 1982, dispelled prior assumptions that Bach would have composed the concerto in Köthen: Bach's extant autograph parts indicate that the concerto was composed in Leipzig, likely in 1730 or the earlier part of 1731. The New Bach Edition published the concerto in 1986, edited by Dietrich Kilian. According to Peter Wollny, writing in 1999, "The Concerto for two violins in D minor BWV 1043 is today one of the best-known and most frequently performed works of the composer, above all by virtue of its soulful, song-like middle movement."

According to Michael Miller, writing for Penguin's Complete Idiot's Guides, the concerto is one of Bach's eleven most notable compositions. In the Rough Guides, the Double Concerto is described as "one of Bach's very greatest works." The BBC website describes the concerto as "one of Bach's best loved instrumental works." According to the British Classic FM website, "the 'Bach Double' is one of the most famous of his works." The uDiscover Music website lists it among ten essential pieces by the composer.

Recordings
Recordings of the concerto include:

References

Sources 
By title:
 
 
 
 
 
 
 
 
 
 
 
By author:

External links
 
 
 
 Bach: Double Concerto (CD review) podcast at BBC Sounds website.

Concertos by Johann Sebastian Bach
Bach
Compositions for string orchestra
Compositions in D minor
1730 compositions

de:Violinkonzerte (Bach)#Doppelkonzert für zwei Violinen d-Moll BWV 1043